Nesrin Şamdereli (born 1979) is a Turkish-German screenwriter of Zaza origin and film director. She directed for the first time the film adaptation of her screenplay for Delicious (2004).

Filmography
 Almanya – Willkommen in Deutschland (2011)
 Türkisch für Anfänger (2006)
 Delicious (2004)
 Sextasy (2004)
 Alles getürkt (2002)
 Kısmet (2000)

Personal life 
Şamdereli is the sister of Yasemin Şamdereli.

References

External links

1979 births
German people of Turkish descent
Film people from Dortmund
German women film directors
Living people